The 1990 Cupa României Final was the 52nd final of Romania's most prestigious football cup competition. It was disputed between Dinamo București and Steaua București, and was won by Dinamo București after a game with ten goals. It was the seventh cup for Dinamo București.

Route to the final

Match details

See also 
List of Cupa României finals

References

External links
Romaniansoccer.ro

1990
Cupa
Romania
FC Dinamo București matches
FC Steaua București matches
May 1990 sports events in Romania